Sir Robert Alexander Gatehouse (30 January 1924 – 30 October 2002) was a British barrister and judge. He was  a judge of the High Court (Queen's Bench Division) from 1985 to 1996.

The son of Major-General Alexander Hugh Gatehouse, he attended Wellington College, before being commissioned into the Royal Dragoons during the Second World War.

References 

 https://www.thetimes.co.uk/article/sir-robert-gatehouse-2d3dblskvfp
 https://www.ukwhoswho.com/view/10.1093/ww/9780199540891.001.0001/ww-9780199540884-e-16855

Knights Bachelor
2002 deaths
Queen's Bench Division judges
British Army personnel of World War II
People educated at Wellington College, Berkshire
1924 births